is a former Japanese football player.

Playing career
Nakamura was born in Osaka Prefecture on May 9, 1974. After graduating from high school, he joined his local club Gamba Osaka in 1993. Although he played as forward, he could not play many matches. In 1996, he moved to Japan Football League club Honda. In 1999, he moved to Japan Football League club Mito HollyHock. The club won the 3rd place in 1999 and was promoted to J2 League. He retired end of 2001 season.

Club statistics

References

External links

1974 births
Living people
Association football people from Osaka Prefecture
Japanese footballers
J1 League players
J2 League players
Japan Football League (1992–1998) players
Japan Football League players
Gamba Osaka players
Honda FC players
Mito HollyHock players
Association football forwards